Anne Easter Smith is an English-American historical novelist known for her series of novels set in England in the 15th C.

Biography
Easter Smith grew up in England, Germany and Egypt.  Her brother John Easter was England's No. 1 squash player in the 1970s, and she is the aunt of England's retired rugby No. 8, Nick Easter.  She has worked as an executive secretary in London, Paris, New York, and Sacramento; as a newspaper reporter/editor at the Press-Republican in Plattsburgh, N.Y.; and variously as a folk singer and theater director.

Her lifelong fascination with King Richard III led her to write six books set during the Wars of the Roses, featuring Richard and various members of his York family.

Easter Smith's best-selling first novel, A Rose for the Crown, has as its central theme the love story between Richard, while he was Duke of Gloucester and during the reign of his brother Edward IV, and the woman who gave birth to Richard's pre-marriage illegitimate children.

In her second novel, Easter Smith focuses on Margaret of York, Richard and Edward's sister, who, like all royals of the time, anticipates a marriage negotiated for political advantage.  Margaret is wedded to Charles the Bold, ruler of the Duchy of Burgundy, the wealthiest in Europe.  Daughter of York tells the story of Margaret's early life in England, her lavish wedding to Charles, and both her personal and public life in Burgundy's leading cities, which at the time included Bruges, Binche, and Mechelen, among others.

Easter Smith's third novel, The King's Grace, explores the identity of Perkin Warbeck, a pretender to the throne, through the eyes of Grace Plantagenet, an illegitimate daughter of King Edward IV. Her fourth novel, Queen by Right, reveals the long and colorful life of Cecily Neville, mother of Edward IV and Richard III.

Royal Mistress, the author's fifth novel, features the life of Jane Shore, the favorite and final mistress of Edward IV.  The story of her rise and fall has been retold by playwrights, poets and balladeers down the centuries.

Finally, Easter Smith's sixth novel, This Son of York, is the story of one of history's most compelling and controversial kings, Richard III.  His story was made even more intriguing following the discovery in 2012 of his bones buried under a car park in Leicester. Easter Smith's portrait incorporates new knowledge of this king from the archeological research and brings to life the troubled, complex Richard of Gloucester, who ruled for two years over an England tired of war and civil strife. The loyal and dutiful youngest son of York, Richard lived most of his short life in the shadow of his brother, Edward IV, loyally supporting his sibling until the mantle of power was thrust unexpectedly on him.

Selected works 

 A Rose for the Crown, Simon & Schuster, 2006.
 Daughter of York, Simon & Schuster, 2008.
 The King's Grace, Simon & Schuster, 2009.
 Queen by Right, Simon & Schuster, 2011.
 Royal Mistress, Simon & Schuster, 2013.
 This Son of York, Bellastoria Press, 2019.

Sources 
 https://web.archive.org/web/20070502064956/http://www.historicalnovelsociety.org/ec-feb-2006.htm#arose

External links 
 Official web site
 NPR radio interview 2013

Year of birth missing (living people)
American historical novelists
Living people
American women novelists
21st-century American novelists
21st-century American women writers
Women historical novelists